Dana Glacier is a glacier about 30 nautical miles (60 km) long on the east side of Palmer Land. It drains the slopes at the southeast side of the Welch Mountains and flows east then northeast to discharge into the head of Lehrke Inlet just north of Parmelee Massif. Mapped by United States Geological Survey (USGS) in 1974. Named by Advisory Committee on Antarctic Names (US-ACAN) for Commander John B. Dana, U.S. Navy, Commanding Officer of U.S. Navy Squadron VXE-6 in Antarctica during Operation Deep Freeze, 1973; he was squadron Executive Officer, 1972, and Operations Officer, 1971.

References

Glaciers of Antarctica